Albina Lucy Charlotte Osipowich (February 26, 1911 – June 6, 1964), later known by her married name Albina Van Aken, was an American competition swimmer who won gold medals in the women's 100-meter freestyle and 4×100-meter freestyle relay at the 1928 Summer Olympics in Amsterdam, setting world records in both events.

In 1933 Osipowich graduated from Pembroke College (Brown University) in Providence, Rhode Island, where she played field hockey and continued swimming as a hobby. She later worked as a buyer for a department store and married basketball player Harrison Van Aken. The Brown Athletic Hall of Fame includes Albina Osipowich Van Aken ’33, inducted in 1984.

See also
 List of members of the International Swimming Hall of Fame
 List of Brown University people
 List of Olympic medalists in swimming (women)
 World record progression 100 metres freestyle
 World record progression 4 × 100 metres freestyle relay

References

External links
 
  Albina Osipowich (USA) – Honor Swimmer profile at International Swimming Hall of Fame

 

1911 births
1964 deaths
American female freestyle swimmers
American people of Lithuanian descent
World record setters in swimming
Olympic gold medalists for the United States in swimming
Pembroke College in Brown University alumni
Sportspeople from Worcester, Massachusetts
Swimmers at the 1928 Summer Olympics
Medalists at the 1928 Summer Olympics
20th-century American women
20th-century American people